This is a list of fictional humanoid species in television. It is a collection of various notable humanoid species that are featured in television programs, either live-action shows or puppetry, but not species of animated programs.

References

Television